Michael Wolffsohn (born 17 May 1947) is a German historian. Wolffsohn was born in Tel Aviv, in what was then the British Mandate of Palestine and today is Israel. His parents were German Jews who fled in 1939.

In 1954, the Wolffsohns moved to Germany, settling in West Berlin. In 1966, Wolffsohn began his studies at the Free University of Berlin and continued his studies at Tel Aviv University and Columbia University. He obtained a PhD in History in 1975. From 1967 to 1970, Wolffsohn served in the Israeli Defence Forces. From 1975 until 1980, Wolffsohn taught at the University of the Saarland. Since 1981, Wolffsohn has served as a professor at the Bundeswehr University Munich as a professor in Contemporary History. His major interests are Israeli history, international relations, and German Jewish history.

Wolffsohn has argued in favor of German patriotism and has claimed that the crimes of National Socialism represent no reason why modern Germans cannot be proud of their country. In his book Eternal Guilt? (1993), he argued against the idea of Germans having to bear guilt for the Holocaust for all time.

Wolffsohn has strongly supported Israel and has argued for greater Western understanding and support of the Jewish state in face of what Wolffsohn regards as fanatical Islamic extremism. Likewise, Wolffsohn has supported the War on Terror and the administration of George W. Bush. In May 2005, he was a leading critic of the chairman of the Social Democratic Party of Germany, Franz Müntefering, who compared a group of American capitalists attempting to purchase a German company to a “plague of locusts”. Wolffsohn noted that the capitalists in question were Jewish, and that the Nazis had often compared Jews to locusts,  and labeled Müntefering an anti-Semite.  Wolffsohn wrote that as a grandson of Holocaust survivors, he was grateful to the Americans for liberating his grandparents and that as a German Jew, he felt deep shame over increasing German anti-Americanism. More recently, Wolffsohn has been a leading critic of the novelist Günter Grass over his disclosure about his membership in the Waffen-SS during World War II.

Wolffsohn is a strong supporter of Chancellor Angela Merkel's refugee policy calling migrants "a gift from the heavens" in an August 2015 guest column for leading German language business newspaper Handelsblatt.  In the same article, he called the native German population's fear of "peaceful immigrants in search of sanctuary or a better life", "hysterical, dumb and their expulsion immoral as well as detrimental to their own interests."

Comment about Greek Elections of 2015 
On 16 February 2015 he upset Greek people by publishing his provocative opinion that Greeks behaved like idiots by electing Alexis Tsipras for prime minister on 25 January 2015 elections.

Work
Meine Juden—eure Juden, Piper 1997 . 
Die Deutschland Akte: Juden und Deutsche in Ost und West : Tatsachen und Legenden, Ed. Ferenczy bei Bruckmann 1995 . 
Frieden jetzt? Nahost im Umbruch, Ed. Ferenczy bei Bruckmann . 
Eternal Guilt? Forty Years of German-Jewish Relations, Columbia University Press 1993 . 
Verwirrtes Deutschland? Provokative Zwischenberufe eines deutschjüdischen Patrioten, Ed. Frenczy bei Bruckmann 1993 . 
Wem gehört das Heilige Land? Die Wurzeln des Streits zwischen Juden und Arabern, C. Bertelsmann 1992 . 
Spanien, Deutschland und die "Jüdische Weltmacht": über Moral, Realpolitik und Vergangenheitsbewältigung, C. Bertelsmann . 
Keine Angst vor Deutschland! Straube 1990 . 
Ewige Schuld? 40 Jahre deutsch-juedisch-israelische Beziehungen, Munich: Piper, 1989 .
Israel : polity, society, economy, 1882-1986: An introductory handbook, Atlantic Highlands, NJ: Humanities Press International, 1987 . 
West Germany's Foreign Policy in the Era of Brandt and Schmidt, 1969–1982: An Introduction, Peter Lang Publishing 1986 . 
German-Saudi Arabian Arms Deals 1936–1939 and 1981–1985: With an essay on West Germany’s Jews, Frankfurt am Main: P. Lang, 1985, . 
Die Debatte über den Kalten Krieg: Politische Konjunkturen, historisch-politische Analysen, Leske + Budrich 1982 .

References

External links 

 A German View on Middle Eastern Transformation
 JEWS IN GERMANY TODAY – CONTRADICTIONS IN PROGRESS
 Review of Eternal Guilt? Forty Years of German-Jewish-Israeli Relations

1947 births
Living people
20th-century German historians
Israeli emigrants to Germany
Jewish historians
Academic staff of Bundeswehr University Munich
Members of the European Academy of Sciences and Arts
German male non-fiction writers
Recipients of the Cross of the Order of Merit of the Federal Republic of Germany
21st-century German Jews